Sir Edward Waldegrave (c. 15161 September 1561) was an English courtier and Catholic recusant.

Family
Edward Waldegrave was the eldest son of John Waldegrave (died 1543) by Lora Rochester, daughter of Sir John Rochester of Essex, and sister of Sir Robert Rochester. He was the grandson of Sir Edward Waldegrave of Bures, Suffolk, and a descendant of Sir Richard Waldegrave, Speaker of the House of Commons.

Career
In 1547 Waldegrave joined the household of Princess Mary, and was granted the manor and rectory of West Haddon, Northamptonshire. He also bought the manor of Borley in Essex, and made that his home.

In 1551 he was imprisoned in the Tower of London by King Edward VI (with Rochester and Francis Englefield), for refusing to carry out the Privy Council's ban on Mary having mass said in her house of Copt Hall, near Epping, Essex. He was released a year later and on Mary's accession in 1553 he was knighted, admitted to the Privy Council, granted the manors of Navestock, Essex, and Chewton, Somerset, and appointed Master of the Great Wardrobe.

Waldegrave was then elected to the Parliament of England for Wiltshire in October 1553, twice for Somerset in 1554 and lastly for Essex in 1558.  He succeeded Rochester as Chancellor of the Duchy of Lancaster in 1554 and was granted the manor of Cobham, Kent.  However, after Mary's death a year later, he was dismissed from all his posts and committed to the Tower again, by Queen Elizabeth, for allowing mass to be celebrated in his house.

Waldegrave died in the Tower in 1561. His grandson was Sir Edward Waldegrave, 1st Baronet.

As Master of the Wardrobe, Waldegrave managed the financial account of the funeral of Edward VI. Waldegrave had a budget of £1300 and a consignment of rich fabrics delivered from the queen's stock by Ralph Sadler.

Marriage and issue
Waldegrave married Frances Neville, a daughter of the executed Sir Edward Neville, by whom he had five children.

Notes

References

 
Burke's Peerage & Gentry

1510s births
1561 deaths
Chancellors of the Duchy of Lancaster
Members of the Privy Council of England
Edward Waldegrave
16th-century Roman Catholics
English Roman Catholics
Prisoners in the Tower of London
English MPs 1553 (Mary I)
English MPs 1554
English MPs 1554–1555
English MPs 1558
People from Braintree District
People from West Haddon